Gonzalo Rodríguez may refer to:

Gonzalo Rodríguez (athlete), Mexican sprinter
Gonzalo Rodríguez (footballer, born 1984), Argentine footballer
Gonzalo Rodríguez (footballer, born 1987), Argentine footballer
Gonzalo Rodríguez (footballer, born 1990), Argentine footballer
Gonzalo Rodríguez (footballer, born 1991), Spanish footballer
Gonzalo Rodríguez (footballer, born 1997), Argentine footballer
Gonzalo Rodríguez (racing driver) (1972–1999), racing driver
Gonzalo Ruiz (died 1205), also known as Gonzalo Rodríguez, former ruler of La Bureba in Spain
José Gonzalo Rodríguez Gacha (1947–1989), Colombian drug lord
Gonzalo Rodriguez-Pereyra (born 1969), Argentine philosopher
Gonzalo Rodríguez Lafora (1886–1971), Spanish neurologist
Gonzalo Rodríguez Risco (born 1972), Peruvian playwright and screenwriter
Gonzalo Rodríguez Girón (c. 1160–1231), one of Castile's wealthiest and most powerful nobles
Gonzalo Rodríguez Anaya (born 1942), Mexican politician
Gonzalo Rodríguez de las Varillas (1270-1345), Spanish nobleman